Cliff Shaw (August 30, 1943 – June 15, 1993) was a Canadian football player who played for the Saskatchewan Roughriders. He won the Grey Cup with them 1966. He died of liver disease in 1993.

References

External links

1943 births
1993 deaths
Saskatchewan Roughriders players